The 30th World Cup season began in November 1995 in Tignes, France, and concluded in March 1996 at the World Cup finals in Lillehammer, Norway.  The overall champions were Lasse Kjus of Norway and Katja Seizinger of Germany, the first of two overall titles for both.

The World Cup schedule was realigned for the 1995–96 season, with the North American events moved to the early part of the season, in late November and early December. Previously, these races in Canada and the United States were scheduled near the end of the season, in late February and early March.

A break in the schedule was for the 1996 World Championships, held 12–25 February in souther Spain at Sierra Nevada.  These championships were originally scheduled for 1995, but were postponed due to a lack of snow.

Calendar

Men

Ladies

Men

Overall 
see complete table

Downhill 

see complete table

In Men's Downhill World Cup 1995/96 all results count.

Super G 

see complete table

In Men's Super G World Cup 1995/96 all results count. Atle Skårdal won the cup with only one race win. All races were won by a different athlete.

Giant Slalom 

see complete table

In Men's Giant Slalom World Cup 1995/96 all results count.

Slalom 

see complete table

In Men's Slalom World Cup 1995/96 all results count. Sébastien Amiez won the cup despite only one race win.

Combined 

see complete table

In Men's Combined World Cup 1995/96 both results count.

Ladies

Overall

Downhill

Super G

Giant Slalom

Slalom

Combined

References

External links
FIS-ski.com - World Cup standings - 1996

FIS Alpine Ski World Cup
World Cup
World Cup